Fabián Andrés González Lasso (born 23 November 1992) is a Colombian footballer who currently plays as a forward for Júbilo Iwata.

Career statistics

Club

Notes

References

External links

Profile at Júbilo Iwata

1992 births
Living people
Colombian footballers
Colombian expatriate footballers
Association football forwards
Categoría Primera A players
Peruvian Segunda División players
Peruvian Primera División players
Deportivo Pasto footballers
La Equidad footballers
Sport Áncash footballers
Ayacucho FC footballers
Academia Deportiva Cantolao players
Millonarios F.C. players
Atlético Nacional footballers
Júbilo Iwata players
Colombian expatriate sportspeople in Peru
Expatriate footballers in Peru
Colombian expatriate sportspeople in Japan
Expatriate footballers in Japan
Sportspeople from Cauca Department